Robert Page (fl. 1395–1397) was an English politician.

He was a Member (MP) of the Parliament of England for Old Sarum in 1395 and September 1397.

References

Year of birth missing
Year of death missing
English MPs 1395
English MPs September 1397